In Ohio, State Route 33 may refer to:
U.S. Route 33 in Ohio, the only Ohio highway numbered 33 since about 1938
Ohio State Route 33 (1923), now SR 108

33